Michael John Ennis (25 April 1901 – 18 April 1948) was an Australian rules footballer who played with  in the Victorian Football League (VFL).

Family
The eldest son of Thomas John Ennis (who played for Carlton in 1896)  and Mary Josephine Ennis, née Sullivan, Michael John Ennis was born at Carlton on 25 April 1901.

Football

Carlton reserves
Stated as originally being from Numurkah Football Club, Ennis played with the Carlton reserves in 1922 and 1923.

Port Melbourne (VFA)
Ennis transferred to Port Melbourne in the Victorian Football Association shortly before the 1923 final series. Ennis made 27 appearances for Port Melbourne, including playing in their losing 1923 Grand Final side and kicking 62 goals in the 1924 season.

Hawthorn
Ennis joined Hawthorn early in the 1925 VFL season
and made 19 appearances over his three seasons with Hawthorn, scoring 42 goals, but failed to cement a regular starting position. He retired at the end of the 1927 season.

Later life
In 1930 Ennis married Verna Mary Murcutt (1902–1984) and they had four children before he died at the age of 46.

Mick Ennis is buried at Box Hill Cemetery.

Notes

External links 

Mick Ennis's playing statistics from The VFA Project

1901 births
1948 deaths
Australian rules footballers from Melbourne
Australian Rules footballers: place kick exponents
Port Melbourne Football Club players
Hawthorn Football Club players
People from Carlton, Victoria